Graham Charles Stuart (born 24 October 1970) is an English former professional footballer and sports commentator.

As a player, he was an attacking midfielder and forward from 1989 until 2005. He spent the majority of his career in the Premier League, playing in the top tier of English football for Chelsea, Everton, Charlton Athletic and Norwich City. He also had a two-year spell with Sheffield United, and was capped 5 times, scoring twice for England U21.

Playing career
Stuart had spells at Everton, Chelsea, Sheffield United and Charlton Athletic. At Chelsea he was part of a new young midfield, he played mainly wide right, with Graeme Le Saux on the left. Stuart spent the majority of his Everton career playing as a right midfielder, but did also spend time playing as a centre-forward (including the victories in the 1995 FA Cup semi-final and final). During his time he won the FA Cup in 1995, beating Manchester United 1–0 in the final at Wembley; his shot from inside the penalty area hit the bar, but Paul Rideout headed the ball into the empty net.

Nicknamed 'Diamond' during this time at Everton, Stuart's most famous moment in a blue shirt came on 7 May 1994. He scored two goals as Mike Walker's Everton defeated Wimbledon at Goodison Park on the final day of the season to escape relegation by the slimmest of margins. He scored the winning goal nine minutes from time, completing a comeback after the Blues had fallen 2–0 down in the game.

Stuart joined Norwich City in 2005. He played eight games for the club before being forced to retire due to injury.

After football
Since his retirement from professional football in August 2005, at the age of 34, Stuart has done occasional television work for Sky Sports and worked at a financial management company which represents the interests of other sportspeople.

Honours
Everton
FA Cup: 1995

Career statistics
Source:

References

External links

Career information at ex-canaries.co.uk

1970 births
Living people
Footballers from Tooting
English footballers
England under-21 international footballers
Association football midfielders
Association football forwards
Chelsea F.C. players
Everton F.C. players
Sheffield United F.C. players
Charlton Athletic F.C. players
Norwich City F.C. players
English Football League players
Premier League players
FA Cup Final players